Kottappurathe Koottukudumbam is a 1997 Indian Malayalam-language comedy-drama film directed by Pappan Naripatta and starring Vijayaraghavan and Urvashi in the lead roles. It is a remake of the 1991 Tamil film Pondatti Sonna Kettukanum.

Plot
A poor couple get their son married to a woman who is rich because of their ambitions of becoming wealthy. However, when her family spirals into poverty, they cast her out of the house.

Cast
Vijayaraghavan as Sahadevan 
Maniyanpilla Raju	as Mahadevan 
Kalabhavan Mani  as Vamadevan 
Vijayakumar as Jayadevan
Urvasi as Sridevi teacher 
Meera as Maya Menon
Indrans as Balan
Dharshna as Stella
Rajan P. Dev as Bhaskara Menon
Oduvil Unnikrishnan as Gopalan
Baburaj as Anthony
Janardanan	as Bharathan Pilla
K. P. A. C. Lalitha as Madhaviamma 
Kalpana as Chandrika 
 Chandni Shaju as Meenakshi (Meenu)
A. C. Zainuddin as S. I.
Paravoor Ramachandran as DIG Ramakrishnan

Soundtrack
"Enthishttamaanu" - KJ Yesudas
"Mindaappenninte Karalile"	- KS Chithra
"Pennin Vaaku Kelkkena" - Sujatha Mohan, Biju Narayanan, Ambili, Pradip Somasundaran, RK Ramadas
"Kaakkathampuraatti" -	KS Chithra
"Pennin Vaaku Kelkkenam (Female)" - 	Sujatha Mohan, Ambili

References

External links

1997 films
1990s Malayalam-language films
Malayalam remakes of Tamil films
Films scored by Kaithapram Damodaran Namboothiri